Davis Field may refer to:

 Davis Field (Georgia), an airport in Folkston, Georgia, United States (FAA: 3J6)
 Davis Field (Oklahoma), an airport in Muskogee, Oklahoma, United States (FAA: MKO)
 Bayport Aerodrome, formerly known as Davis Field, in Bayport, New York, United States (FAA: 23N)
 Manassas Regional Airport, also known as Harry P. Davis Field, Manassas, Virginia, United States (FAA: HEF)

See also
 Davis Airport (disambiguation)